beIN Sports France is a French network of sports channels owned by Qatari Sports Investments (an affiliate of beIN Media Group) and operated by Mediapro. It is the French version of the global sports network beIN Sports.

History
In 2011, Al Jazeera Sport acquired the rights of broadcasting some of the French football league matches inside France and full marketing rights for the French league outside France.

Monday, 5 December 2011 UEFA announced on its website that Al Jazeera Sport awarded media rights in France for UEFA Champions League 2012–15.

According to the UEFA website, each season Al Jazeera Sport will broadcast 133 matches live across its television channels, internet and mobile services. The broadcaster has also committed to significant pre-match preview programming and highlights on both UEFA Champions League matchnights.

BeIN Sport 1 launched on 1 June 2012 at 19h and BeIN Sport 2 launched on 27 July 2012 at 20h. BeIN Sport Max additional channels were launched on 10 August 2012. This was the launch of the BeIN brand.

Their programmes are operated by Mediapro.

On 1 January 2014, beIN Sport became beIN Sports, to show that it is multisports and not only football.

beIN Sports 3 was launched on 15 September 2014, replacing beIN Sports Max 3.

Programming

Football
Europe: UEFA European Championship, UEFA European Under-21 Championship

France: Coupe de France
Germany: Bundesliga, DFL-Supercup
Italy: Serie A (until 2021)
Spain: La Liga
United Kingdom: EFL Championship, EFL Cup, FA Community Shield, FA Cup
Turkey: Süper Lig
South America: Copa América
Africa: CAF World Cup Qualifiers, Africa Cup of Nations, Africa Cup of Nations Qualifiers, CAF Champions League
2018 World Cup, 2022 World Cup
International Champions Cup
Brasil Global Tour

Rugby union
Pro14
European Rugby Champions Cup
European Rugby Challenge Cup

Handball
IHF
Europe: EHF Champions League, Women's EHF Champions League, European Men's Handball Championship, European Women's Handball Championship
France: LNH Division 1, Coupe de la Ligue, Trophée des champions, Coupe de France, Coupe de France de handball féminin
Germany: Handball-Bundesliga

American Football
NFL

Baseball
MLB

Basketball
NBA

Beach volleyball
FIVB Beach Volleyball World Tour

Boxing 

 Top Rank (until 2022)

Cycling
UCI Road World Championships
UCI Track Cycling World Championships

Rugby league
Super League
National Rugby League
State of Origin series
Rugby League World Cup

Swimming
FINA Swimming World Cup
Open de France de natation
French Swimming Federation Golden Tour
Championnats de France de natation

Tennis
Wimbledon
ATP World Tour 250 series
Open 13
Open Parc Auvergne-Rhône-Alpe
Davis Cup
Fed Cup
WTA Tour

Track and field
IAAF World Challenge

Volleyball
Italy: Italian Volleyball League
2014 FIVB Volleyball Men's World Championship
2014 FIVB Volleyball Women's World Championship

References

BeIN Sports
Television stations in France
Sports television networks in France
Television channels and stations established in 2012